Gustav Cords (12 October 1870, Hamburg – 18 February 1951, Berlin) was a German composer.

Biography 
Cords studied composition in Hamburg, Sondershausen, and Wiesbaden from 1887 to 1891 and was a student of Hugo Riemann. He was one of the best students under Riemann during Max Reger's experience as both Cords and Reger were students under Riemann. He was the president of the General German Musicians' Union from 1911 to 1919, in which the organization merged with the Central Union of Civilian Musicians in Germany to form the German Musicians' Union. Afterwards, he became a chamber musician for the Berlin State Opera. Cords was known for his opera, Sonnwendnacht (Solstice Night).

References

External links

Romantic composers
German composers
Musicians from Hamburg
1870 births
1951 deaths